Harper County is the name of two counties in the United States:

 Harper County, Kansas
 Harper County, Oklahoma